Gilberto Dall'Agata (born 27 June 1930) is an Italian racing cyclist. He rode in the 1958 Tour de France.

References

External links
 

1930 births
Living people
Italian male cyclists
Place of birth missing (living people)
People from Cesena
Sportspeople from the Province of Forlì-Cesena
Cyclists from Emilia-Romagna